Lytta arizonica is a species of blister beetle in the family Meloidae. It is found in North America.

References

 Selander, Richard B. (1960). "Bionomics, Systematics, and Phylogeny of Lytta, a Genus of Blister Beetles (Coleoptera, Meloidae)". Illinois Biological Monographs, no. 28, 295.

Further reading

 Arnett, R. H. Jr., M. C. Thomas, P. E. Skelley and J. H. Frank. (eds.). (21 June 2002). American Beetles, Volume II: Polyphaga: Scarabaeoidea through Curculionoidea. CRC Press LLC, Boca Raton, Florida .
 
 Richard E. White. (1983). Peterson Field Guides: Beetles. Houghton Mifflin Company.

Meloidae
Beetles described in 1957